Pedro Bromfman (born 20 January 1976) is a Brazilian musician, film composer, video game composer and music producer. He is primarily known for having scored 2014's RoboCop and the TV series Narcos, Elite Squad and Elite Squad II; the highest-grossing film in Brazil's box office history, and the video game Max Payne 3. Recently, he has composed the music for Panama Papers, "Thumper", The Story Of Us With Morgan Freeman, Chain of Command, The Blackout and the video game Need for Speed Heat. Bromfman's latest project  Far Cry 6 was released by Ubisoft on October 7, 2021. His score for Far Cry 6 is nominated for a BAFTA Award, an ASCAP Award and two G.A.N.G. Awards (Music of the Year and Soundtrack Album of the Year).

Life and career
Pedro Bromfman was born in Rio de Janeiro, Brazil, and was introduced to music at very young age, playing nylon string and electric guitars. When he turned eighteen, Pedro moved to Boston to attend the Berklee College of Music. He graduated cum laude in 1997. Bromfman worked as a session musician, arranger and music producer, before his passion for film scores brought him to California. He studied film scoring at UCLA, after releasing his first solo album, Pé-de-Moleque, in 2000. The album featured some of the best Brazilian instrumentalists, including Sebastião Tapajós, Carlos Malta, Marcelo Martins and Ney Conceição. Pedro Bromfman started his career as a Film/TV composer in 2002, creating music for trailers and commercials. Soon after, he started composing for films and television.  More recently, Pedro has been working extensively on video game scores, he is currently creating the music for Far Cry 6.

Poker
Bromfman is also a poker player. He earned a World Series of Poker bracelet by winning the $10,000 No-Limit 2-7 Lowball Draw Championship in 2022.

Filmography

Films

Television

Video games

Awards and nominations

Awards
ASCAP Award:
2015 – RoboCop
Park City Film Music Festival:
2009 – Elite Squad – Jury Choice Gold Medal for Excellence
2009 – They Killed Sister Dorothy – Audience Choice Gold Medal for Excellence
2008 – Elite Squad – Premio Guarani (Melhor Trilha Sonora)

Nominations
Cinema Brazil Grand Prize:
2008 – Elite Squad – Best Original Music (Melhor Trilha Sonora Original)
2011 – Elite Squad 2 – Best Original Music (Melhor Trilha Sonora Original)
ACIE Awards:
2011 – Elite Squad – Best Music (Melhor Trilha Sonora)
Prêmio Contigo Cinema:
2008 – Elite Squad – Best Music (Melhor Trilha Sonora)

References

External links
Official Website
 
at www.zimbio.com
MTV Artist Profile

1976 births
Brazilian composers
Brazilian film score composers
Male film score composers
Living people
Berklee College of Music alumni
Rock en Español musicians
Brazilian multi-instrumentalists